Max Hansen may refer to:

 Max Hansen (tenor) (1897–1961), Danish singer, actor, and comedian
 Max Hansen (Haven) played by John Bourgeois, a character on the supernatural TV series Haven
 Max Hanson, a character from Trapped in a Purple Haze

See also
 Hansen (disambiguation)
 Max (disambiguation)